Boris Nikitich Markarov (born 12 March 1935) is a Russian water polo player who competed for the Soviet Union in the 1956 Summer Olympics.

He was part of the Soviet team which won the bronze medal in the 1956 tournament. He played four matches and scored one goal.

See also
 List of Olympic medalists in water polo (men)

External links
 

1935 births
Living people
Russian male water polo players
Soviet male water polo players
Olympic water polo players of the Soviet Union
Water polo players at the 1956 Summer Olympics
Olympic bronze medalists for the Soviet Union
Olympic medalists in water polo
Medalists at the 1956 Summer Olympics